The Södermanland Runic Inscription 49  is a Viking Age runestone engraved in Old Norse with the Younger Futhark runic alphabet. The style of the runestone is a categorized as Fp. It is located in Ene in Nyköping Municipality.

Inscription
Transliteration of the runes into Latin characters

 þurþr : auk : tuki + raistu + stain + þansi + aftiʀ + bysiu ++ faþur sin ¤ han + uarþ tauþr : o kniri :
Old Norse transcription:

 

English translation:

 "Þórðr and Tóki raised this stone in memory of Bysja, their father. He died on the cargo-ship."

References

Runestones in Södermanland